Alan Brondino (born 11 April 1998) is an Argentine professional footballer who plays as a defender for Barracas Central.

Career
Brondino began his career with Nueva Chicago. He was moved into their senior squad for the 2017–18 Primera B Nacional season, making his professional debut in a win over All Boys on 2 October 2017. Nine further appearances followed, all of which were starts, as Nueva Chicago finished twenty-third. Brondino was released in June 2020.

On 30 July 2020, Brondino signed with Barracas Central. In August 2021, Brondino joined FADEP (Fundación Amigos por el Deporte).

Career statistics
.

References

External links

1998 births
Living people
Place of birth missing (living people)
Argentine footballers
Association football defenders
Primera Nacional players
Nueva Chicago footballers
Barracas Central players